Upyna (Samogitian: Opīna) is a small town in Šilalė district municipality, Tauragė County, in western Lithuania. According to the 2011 census, the town has a population of 375 people.

History
In 1941, 100 Jews were massacred in a mass execution by an Einsatzgruppen. There is a small memorial at the execution site.

Gallery

References

Towns in Lithuania
Towns in Tauragė County
Rossiyensky Uyezd
Holocaust locations in Lithuania
Šilalė District Municipality